Kevin Locke may refer to:

Kevin Locke (musician) (born 1954 - passed October 1, 2022), Native American musician
Kevin Locke (rugby league) (born 1989), New Zealand rugby league footballer

See also
Kevin Lock (born 1953), English former footballer
Locke (surname)